Mardi Barrie (1930–2004) was a Scottish artist and teacher.

Biography
Barrie was born in Kirkcaldy in Fife. She attended the University of Edinburgh before studying art at the Edinburgh College of Art from 1948. After graduating, in 1953, she taught at Broughton High School in Edinburgh.

Barrie's first solo exhibition was at the Douglas & Foulis Gallery in Edinburgh in 1963, after which she participated in several group shows, both in the UK and overseas. A second solo show at Douglas & Foulis took place in 1966. She also exhibited regularly at the Scottish Gallery in Edinburgh and at the Bruton Gallery in Somerset. During the 1980s she had three solo exhibitions at the Thackeray Gallery in London.

Works by Barrie are held by several museums and other organisations in Scotland, including Kelvingrove Art Gallery and Museum, the Scottish National Gallery of Modern Art and also the Scottish Arts Council and some Scottish Education Authorities. Outside of Scotland, Magdalen College and the Laing Art Gallery hold examples. Barrie was a member of the Royal Scottish Watercolour Society.

References

External links
 

1930 births
2004 deaths
20th-century Scottish painters
20th-century Scottish women artists
Alumni of the University of Edinburgh
Alumni of the Edinburgh College of Art
People from Kirkcaldy
Scottish women painters